Lalnuntluanga Bawitlung (born 27 November 1999) is an Indian professional footballer who plays as a midfielder for Real Kashmir in the I-League.

Club career

Real Kashmir 
On 18 September 2022, Bawitlung was snapped up by I-League club Real Kashmir, on a one-year deal. He made his professional career debut against NEROCA, on 13 November in a 1–0 away win.

Career statistics

Club

References 

1999 births
Living people
Footballers from Mizoram
Indian footballers
Real Kashmir FC players